In computing, direct or immediate mode in an interactive programming system is the immediate execution of commands, statements, or expressions. In many interactive systems, most of these can both be included in programs or executed directly in a read–eval–print loop (REPL).

Most interactive systems also offer the possibility of defining programs in the REPL, either with explicit declarations, such as Python's def, or by labelling them with line numbers. Programs can then be run by calling a named or numbered procedure or by running a main program.

Many programming systems, from Lisp and JOSS to Python and Perl have interactive REPLs which also allow defining programs. Most integrated development environments offer a direct mode where, during debugging and while the program execution is suspended, commands can be executed directly in the current scope and the result is displayed.

Example 

Non-direct mode in Basic
Direct mode in Basic

References 

User interfaces
Computing terminology